Vitali Kanevsky (born 4 September 1935) is a Soviet film director and screenwriter. His film Zamri, umri, voskresni! won the Caméra d'Or at the 1990 Cannes Film Festival. Two years later, his film Samostoyatelnaya zhizn would win the Jury Prize at the 1992 Cannes Film Festival. The film was also nominated for the Golden Bear at the 42nd Berlin International Film Festival.

Filmography
 Derevenskaya istoriya (1981)
 Zamri, umri, voskresni! (1989)
 Samostoyatelnaya zhizn (1992)
 Nous, les enfants du xxème siècle (1994)
 KTO Bolche (2000)

References

External links

1935 births
Living people
Directors of Caméra d'Or winners
European Film Award for Best Screenwriter winners
Male screenwriters
Soviet film directors
Soviet screenwriters